Deč is a village in Serbia. It is situated in the Pećinci municipality, in the Srem District, Vojvodina province. The village has a Serb ethnic majority and a population numbering 1,499 people (2011).

See also

 List of cities, towns and villages in Vojvodina
 List of places in Serbia

 

Populated places in Syrmia
Populated places in Srem District
Pećinci

hr:Šimanovci